Tritriva is a rural municipality in Madagascar. It belongs to the district of Betafo, which is a part of Vakinankaratra Region in Antananarivo Province. The population of the commune was estimated to be approximately 9,536 in 2018.

Only primary schooling is available. The majority 90% of the population of the commune are farmers, while an additional 10% receives their livelihood from raising livestock. The most important crop is potatoes, while other important products are maize, barley, rice and soya.

See also
Lake Tritriva

References 

Populated places in Antananarivo Province